Oom Bay is a well-defined bay, 2 mi wide, indenting the Mawson coast between Cape Bruce and Campbell Head. Discovered in February 1931 by the British Australian and New Zealand Antarctic Research Expedition (BANZARE) under Douglas Mawson, who named it for Lieutenant K.E. Oom, RAN, cartographer with the expedition.

Further reading 
  DMA, Sailing Directions (planning Guide) and (enroute) for Antarctica, P 420

External links 
 Oom Bay on USGS website
 Oom Bay on AADC website
 Oom Bay on SCAR website
 Oom Bay Satellite image
 long term weather forecast for Oom Bay
 Oom Bay area map

References 

Bays of Mac. Robertson Land